In Broad Daylight is a 1988 true crime book by award-winning writer Harry N. MacLean, detailing the killing of town bully Ken Rex McElroy in 1981 in Skidmore, Missouri.  The book won an Edgar Award for best true crime writing in 1989, was a New York Times bestseller for 12 weeks (charting at number 2) and was adapted into a television movie of the same name. The book was reissued in 2007 by St. Martin's Press with a new epilogue.

Overview
In Broad Daylight: A Murder in Skidmore, Missouri details the case of Ken Rex McElroy and his 21-year reign of terror throughout four counties in northwest Missouri, and the ultimate murder of McElroy, who was shot to death as he sat in his pickup truck on the main street of the town. Although there were more than 45 witnesses to the killing, and three grand juries considered the case, no one has been prosecuted for the killing.

McElroy was indicted 21 times and acquitted 20 times for his life of crime - due in large part to the keen legal abilities of his Kansas City attorney Richard Gene McFadin. MacLean carefully details the background history of McElroy's childhood, early and later life, the endurance of the farmers and victims of McElroy's two decades of crime and terror, the failure of the criminal justice system to even superficially respond to McElroy's crime spree, the State of Missouri's bemused reaction to McElroy's death, the federal government's sudden interest in pursuing McElroy's death as a civil rights violation, and ultimately the skewed and misinformed coverage of the story by the national and international press and media. Critics have praised MacLean's lyrical depiction of rural, bucolic agricultural life in America's heartland - contrasted with a methodical and chilling description of the actions, causes and consequences of an ongoing nightmare of domestic terror.

The book, as well as the movie, chronicles the story of McElroy’s crimes, his killing on July 10, 1981, and the alleged coverup by the town of the identity of the killers for more than 30 years.

References 

Sources:
Eberhart, John Mark,  "Silence prevails In Broad Daylight: Book’s new epilogue offers details in 1981 fatal shooting of man in Skidmore, Mo." The Kansas City Star, January 14, 2007.
"Skidmore still hush on killing of town bully," Columbia Daily Tribune, January 7, 2007.
Martin, Claire, "Town's shame, without blame," Denver Post, December 31, 2006.
Peterson, Iver, "Missouri Town Is Silent Over Shooting Of The County Bully," New York Times, July 17, 1981.
Marshall, Thom, The town that killed a bully: Was it vigilante action?", Houston Chronicle, January 1, 1989.

1988 non-fiction books
Edgar Award-winning works
Non-fiction books about murders in the United States
Missouri culture
Crime in Missouri